The Armenian cemetery in Hyderabad, also known as Uppuguda Armenian cemetery, is a three-hundred-year-old cemetery, belongs from Qutb Shahi period. The Armenian cemetery is located at Uppuguda (former Opiguda) a suburb of Hyderabad, India.

The cemetery
The site houses Armenian cemeteries and churchyard. Total of 19 Armenian are buried in this cemetery, including two priests Rev Johannes (1680) and Rev Simon (1724). This is the last known trace of the Armenian relation with the city of Hyderabad, India. 

There was considerable Armenian settlement in Hyderabad, the Armenian community of Hyderabad received a Pontifical Bull from Holy Etchmiadzin. The cemetery was shared by the Dutch and English people residing in Hyderabad, India in those times as there was no specific cemetery for them.

Conservation
Armenian cemetery in Hyderabad, India is protected monument by Department of Archaeology under the Indian archaeological sites and remains Act, 1960. It is almost on the verge of being erased due to negligence of residents and responsible department.

See also
Armenians in India
Armenia–India relations

References

External links
The cemetery Image.
The current condition of cemetery, Image.
Book source
Armenian settlement in India

Cemeteries in India
History of Hyderabad, India
Hyderabad State
Heritage structures in Hyderabad, India
Tourist attractions in Hyderabad, India
 
17th-century establishments in India